Arabic Extended-C is a Unicode block encoding Qur'anic marks used in Turkey.

Block

History 
The following Unicode-related documents record the purpose and process of defining specific characters in the Arabic Extended-C block:

References 

Unicode blocks